Cellulomonas persica is a mesophilic and cellulolytic bacterium from the genus Cellulomonas which has been isolated from forest soil in Iran.

References

 

Micrococcales
Bacteria described in 2000